Keepers of the Waters is a nonprofit organisation that focuses on water activism. It was founded by Betsy Damon, an artist and environmental activist, in 1991 with the assistance of the Hubert Humphrey Institute. The organization encourages "art, science, and community projects for the understanding and remediation of living water systems." As part of this initiative, Damon, assisted by Chengdu-based artist Dai Guanyu, organized two large-scale public events in Chengdu in China and Lhasa in Tibet in 1995 and 1996, respectively, where they invited local and international artists, such as Song Dong, Yin Xiuzhen, Dai Guanyu, and Zhang Shengquan to create new works that respond to the major rivers in these cities. These events featured works that are collaborative, participatory, community-driven, and engaging with the land. They therefore provide a different perspective to the art historical canon about performance art in China in the 1990s, which had mainly focused on individual performances by male artists who created performances indoors.

Public events in China 
Two events were organised in China where different artists participated:

The first event was organized between 29 July and 14 August in 1995 around Funan River in Chengdu.

List of participating artists:
Ang Sang
Beth Grossman
Cai Jian
Christine Baeumler
Dai Guangyu
Ge Ci
He Qichao
Kristin Caskey
Liu Chengying
Suri Lamnu
Tang Liping
Wang Peng
Xu Hongbin
Yang Lijun
Yang Qi
Yin Xiaofeng
Yin Xiuzhen
Yu Leiqing
Zeng Xun
Zhong Bo
Zhou Zheng

The second event was organized between 18 August and 3 September in 1996 around Lhasa River in Tibet.

List of participating artists:
Ang Sang
Ang Xin
DAI Guangyu
LI Jixiang
LIU Chengying
RUAN Haiying
SONG Dong
Suri Lamnu
Suvan GEER
YANG Kayva
YIN Xiuzhen
ZHANG Lei
ZHANG Shengquan
ZHANG Xin

More links 

 Website
 The Lhasa event

References 

Water and the environment